The seventh team of English cricketers toured the West Indies in the 1912–13 season.  The tour was organised by MCC.  As in 1910–11, the team was captained by AWF Somerset.  The tour involved a total of 9 matches, all of which are regarded as first-class, between January and March 1913.

The players
A party of 13 was taken:

 Arthur Somerset senior, Captain
 Cecil Burton
 Bernard Dobson
 George Docker
 Mordaunt Doll
 Sydney Fairbairn
 Punter Humphreys
 Arthur Jaques
 Albert Relf
 Sydney Smith
 Razor Smith
 Arthur Somerset junior
 Tom Whittington

Arthur Somerset senior, his son Arthur Somerset junior, Burton, Sydney Smith and Whittington had toured with the previous MCC team of 1910–11. Three good professionals were included, Humphreys, Relf and Razor Smith.  Burton, Sydney Smith and Whittington had performed well on the previous tour and were arguably the best of the amateurs.  As in the previous MCC tour the remaining players had little first-class experience.  Despite being 57 years old the captain kept wicket in all the matches.

The tour
The side arrived in Barbados on the RMS Magdalena on 27 January.

Matches played were:

 30–31 January and 1 February : v Barbados
 3–5 February : v Barbados
 6–8 February : v West Indies XI (in Barbados)
 14–16 February : v Trinidad
 17–19 February : v Trinidad
 20–22 February : v West Indies XI (in Trinidad)
 1–4 March : v British Guiana
 6–8 March : v West Indies XI (in British Guiana)
 11–13 March : v British Guiana

Of the nine first class matches played in Barbados, Trinidad and British Guiana, five were won, three lost and one drawn.

The tourists lost the first two matches against Barbados by an innings but then defeated a West Indies XI with Humphreys taking 13 wickets.

Moving on to Trinidad, the tourists won the first match but were lucky to draw the second. In the second match against the West Indies XI, Ince made 167 for the home side and they won by an innings. Cumberbatch was bowled when he shouldered his bat because he had been distracted by leaves blowing across the pitch. Given out by the umpire, he appealed to Somerset and was allowed to continue his innings, a sporting gesture by the captain. Burton and the captain added 89 for the last wicket in the MCC second innings and were only separated with 20 minutes remaining.

In British Guiana, the two matches against the colony were won comfortably and the third match against the West Indies XI was also won by 10 wickets with Humphreys scoring a century adding 152 with Whittington. Jaques and the captain added 80 for the last wicket. Moulder carried his bat in the West Indies second innings.

The three professionals headed the batting averages and, with Sydney Smith, took most of the wickets. Burton, Whittington and Sydney Smith also performed well with the bat.

Averages

The following averages are from the 9 first class matches (Batting Bowling).

Batting

Bowling

References

External sources
  CricketArchive

Annual reviews
 Wisden Cricketers' Almanack 1914

Further reading
 Peter Wynne-Thomas, The Complete History of Cricket Tours at Home & Abroad, Guild, 1989
 Cricket – A Weekly Record of the Game.  Cricket Magazine (1913).
 A Guide to First Class Cricket Played in the West Indies.  Association of Cricket Statisticians and Historians. 
 Complete First-class Match List, Volume 1 1801–1914.  Association of Cricket Statisticians and Historians.
 First Class Cricket Matches 1913.  Association of Cricket Statisticians and Historians.

1913 in English cricket
1913 in West Indian cricket
1912-13
International cricket competitions from 1888–89 to 1918
West Indian cricket seasons from 1890–91 to 1917–18